Pearl City Mansion is a 34-storey,  skyscraper at 22-36 Paterson Street in Causeway Bay, Hong Kong near Causeway Bay station. When completed in 1971, it was the tallest building in the city, surpassing Wing On House in Central. It was also the first building in the city to achieve a height greater than 100 metres.

See also
  Timeline of tallest buildings in Hong Kong

References

External links

Office buildings completed in 1971
Skyscraper office buildings in Hong Kong
Residential buildings completed in 1971
Residential skyscrapers in Hong Kong